Elections to Wolverhampton City Council were held on 5 May 2011, the same day as the national referendum on the Alternative Vote, in Wolverhampton, England. One third of the council was up for election.

Composition
Prior to the election, the composition of the council was:

Labour Party 31
Conservative Party 25
Liberal Democrat 4
Note: this differs from the total at the previous election, due to a by-election and a Liberal Democrat councillor defecting to Labour.

Following the election, the composition of the council is:

Labour Party 35
Conservative Party 22
Liberal Democrat 3

Election result

Ward results

References

2011
2010s in the West Midlands (county)
2011 English local elections